Lake O’ the Pines is a reservoir on Big Cypress Bayou, also known as Big Cypress Creek, chiefly in Marion County, Texas, USA. The reservoir also occupies a small part of Upshur and Morris Counties.

History
The reservoir was created as part of the overall plan for flood control in the Red River Basin below Denison Dam in Oklahoma. The project was authorized by the Flood Control Act of 1946. Additional purposes of wildlife conservation, recreation, and water supply were added during construction. The U.S. Army Corps of Engineers began construction of the dam in January 1955 and the dam was completed on December 11, 1959.

Dam and reservoir

The lake provides water supply storage for the Northeast Texas Municipal Water District which serves the cities of Jefferson, Ore City, Lone Star, Avinger, Hughes Springs, Daingerfield, and most recently Longview. Water intake structures are located at various points on the lake and one downstream of the lake.

Monstrous Catfish
Lake O' the Pines has long been known to be home to giant catfish. Legend has it that some of the catfish are so big as to be called monstrous. Most people consider this to be part of fishing folklore as evidence has never been found.

References

External links
U.S. Army Corps of Engineers: Lake O’ the Pines
U.S. Army Corps of Engineers: Corps Lake Gateway: Lake O’ the Pines

Recreation.gov: Ferrells Bridge Dam Lake O’ the Pines
GORP: Parks: Lake O’ the Pines – (Ferrells Bridge Dam) – Texas Corps Projects
Longview Yacht Club
"Poet o' the Pines" Milton Watts - Writer/Poet and Lake o' the Pines area resident

O' the Pines
Ferrells Bridge
Protected areas of Marion County, Texas
Protected areas of Morris County, Texas
Protected areas of Upshur County, Texas
United States Army Corps of Engineers dams
Bodies of water of Marion County, Texas
Bodies of water of Morris County, Texas
Bodies of water of Upshur County, Texas
1959 establishments in Texas